The 2001 LPGA Championship was the 47th LPGA Championship, played June 21–24 at DuPont Country Club in Wilmington, Delaware. This was the third of four major championships on the LPGA Tour in 2001.

Karrie Webb won her only LPGA Championship, two strokes ahead of runner-up Laura Diaz, and completed the career  It was her second consecutive major win, as she also took the U.S. Women's Open earlier in the month.

Webb, age 26, became the fifth and youngest woman to win the career slam, passing Mickey Wright, who completed hers at age 27  It was the fourth of Webb's seven major titles. With a 7-under 64 on Friday, she set the  scoring record at the LPGA Championship at 

The DuPont Country Club hosted this championship for eleven consecutive seasons, from 1994 through 2004.

Past champions in the field

Made the cut

Source:

Missed the cut

Source:

Final leaderboard
Sunday, June 24, 2001

Source:

References

External links
Golf Observer leaderboard
DuPont Country Club

Women's PGA Championship
Golf in Delaware
LPGA Championship
LPGA Championship
LPGA Championship
LPGA Championship
Women's sports in Delaware